Revisionism may refer to:
 Historical revisionism, the critical re-examination of presumed historical facts and existing historiography
 The "revisionists" school of thought in Soviet and Communist studies, as opposed to the Cold War "traditionalists" school
 Historical negationism, concerted denial of claims accepted by mainstream historians, may purport to be historical revisionism but its methodologies have no basis in historiography/profession of history
 Revisionist School of Islamic Studies, which questions whether the traditional accounts about Islam's early times are reliable historical sources
 Revisionism (Ireland), an issue in Irish historiography
 Revisionism (Spain), a derogatory term used in Spanish historiographic debate
 Revisionist Zionism, a nationalist faction within the Zionist movement
 Marxist revisionism, a pejorative term used by some Marxists to describe ideas based on a revision of fundamental Marxist premises
 Fictional revisionism, the retelling of a story with substantial alterations in character or environment, to "revise" the view shown in the original work
 Territorial revisionism, a euphemism for revanchism or irredentism
 Revisionism theory, another word for reformism
 The reevaluation of one's experiences with a hindsight bias

See also 
 Anti-revisionism, a concept in communism
 Censorship
 Revision (disambiguation)